Commissioner Eyck is a 1940 German crime film directed by Milo Harbich and starring Anneliese Uhlig, Paul Klinger and Herbert Wilk.

It was shot at Tempelhof Studios in Berlin. Location shooting took place in Bavaria.

Synopsis
A Berlin detective's holiday is interrupted by a murder at the winter sports hotel he is staying at. Before long he is on the trail of a gang of international criminals.

Cast
 Anneliese Uhlig as Barbara Sydow
 Paul Klinger as Günter Eyck, Kriminalkommissar
 Herbert Wilk as Hans Brandner, Kriminalkommissar
 Hansjoachim Büttner as Gorgas
 Alexander Engel as van Fliet
 Änne Bruck as Inge Brandner
 Lina Carstens as Mrs. Filter
 Fritz Eckert as Farmer
 Andrews Engelmann as Gustafson
 Lothar Geist as Page
 Alfred Haase as Jeweller
 Knut Hartwig as Schröder
 Herbert Hübner as Hauber
 Karl Jüstel as Dancer
 Dorit Kreysler as Mrs. Gustafson
 Walter Kunkel as Van Fliet's employer
 Walter Lieck as Jonny
 Karl-Heinz Peters as Rapper
 Arthur Reppert as Barman
 Just Scheu as Gren
 Egon Stief as Ganove
 Max Vierlinger as Criminal assistant
 Rudolf Vones as Passant
 Irmgard Willers as Chambermaid
 Willy Witte as Barman

References

Bibliography 
 Moeller, Felix. The Film Minister: Goebbels and the Cinema in the Third Reich. Axel Menges, 2000.

External links 
 

1940 films
Films of Nazi Germany
German crime films
1940 crime films
1940s German-language films
Films directed by Milo Harbich
UFA GmbH films
Films shot at Tempelhof Studios
Films set in Berlin
German black-and-white films
1940s German films